Admiral Chandler may refer to:

Alfred W. Chandler (1890–1978), U.S. Navy rear admiral
Alvin Duke Chandler (1902–1987), U.S. Navy vice admiral
Ralph Chandler (1829–1889), U.S. Navy rear admiral
Theodore E. Chandler (1894–1945), U.S. Navy rear admiral
Tom Chandler (The Last Ship), fictional U.S. Navy admiral in the TV series The Last Ship